Inocybe haemacta is a species of fungus in the genus Inocybe. It is found in Europe.

Biochemistry
Inocybe haemacta contains the compounds psilocybin and psilocin.

See also
List of Inocybe species
List of Psilocybin mushrooms

References

Psychedelic tryptamine carriers
haemacta
Fungi of Europe
Fungi described in 1882
Taxa named by Miles Joseph Berkeley